Laskowa  (feminine noun) is a village in Limanowa County, Lesser Poland Voivodeship, in southern Poland. It is the seat of the gmina (administrative district) called Gmina Laskowa.

The village has a population of 3,140 (2011).

Tourism

Marked trails of Island Beskids
Three hotels
T-bar lift
Chair lift

Name

A local tale suggests that a king and his people found a hazel forest here, and he ordered the village to be built, calling it "wieś Laskowa" literally village of hazel.

Laskowa is a feminine noun, that sounds like adjective, means something related to:
 Polish "laska" literally stick (as in e.g. walking stick, stick of rock, or stick of dynamite) or gal.
 Polish "laskowy orzech" literally hazelnut.

People connected with Laskowa
 Józef Joniec - born in Laskowa
 Pat Sajak - his paternal grandfather was born in Laskowa.

References

Villages in Limanowa County